This is a list of notable fictional bars and pubs.

A
Ace of Clubs – Smallville
The Admiral's Arms – Queen of the Damned
The Admiral Benbow Inn – Treasure Island
The Aidensfield Arms – Heartbeat
The Aigburth Arms – Red Dwarf
Alibi Bar – Nick Knatterton
The Alibi Room – Shameless
The Anchor – Dad's Army
The Angler's Rest – the Mr. Mulliner books by P. G. Wodehouse: Meet Mr Mulliner (1927), Mr Mulliner Speaking (1929), and Mulliner Nights (1933)
Archer Hotel – Two Pints of Lager and a Packet of Crisps (2001-2011)
Archie Bunker's Place – Archie Bunker's Place
The Armada Room (at the Hilton Hotel) – where The Blues Brothers track down Murph & the Magic Tones
Attica Bar – Grand Theft Auto: San Andreas

B
BA – Grand Theft Auto: Liberty City Stories
BB Saloon – Gekisou Sentai Carranger
Babylon – Queer as Folk US
The Back Lane Bar – Neighbours
The Bada Bing – The Sopranos
The Ballroom – Community, episode "Mixology Certification"
The Bamboo Lounge – Goodfellas (1990)
The Bang Bang Bar – Twin Peaks (1990)
The Bannered Mare – The Elder Scrolls V: Skyrim
Barbary Coast Saloon – Around the World in 80 Days (1956)
Bar Salade – Grownups
Basement Dive – The Voice of Terror
The Bee and Barb – The Elder Scrolls V: Skyrim
The Beehive – The World's End (film) (2013): The ninth of 12 pubs on the "golden mile" pub crawl
Bellefleur's Bar and Grill – True Blood (2008)
Benzinger's Bar – JAG (1995-2005)
The Bigger Jigger —Mama's Family (1983)
The Black Bull – Emmerdale
Black Eyes Bar (Detroit) —Undateable (2014)
Black Horse – Whatever Happened to the Likely Lads?
The Black Lion – Dad's Army
The Black Swan – Family Affairs
The Blake Hotel – The Full Monty
Blarneys Irish Pub – 2 Broke Girls
Blinking Skull – Dick Tracy's Dilemma
The Bloated Float Inn – The Elder Scrolls IV: Oblivion (an inn located within a converted ship that still sits on the water)
The Blue Anchor – New Tricks
Blue Boar Inn – The Adventures of Robin Hood (Howard Pyle, TV series starring Richard Greene)
Blue Hell – Gateway
The Blue Oyster Bar – Police Academy franchise
The Blue Parrot – rival bar run by Sydney Greenstreet's character Signor Ferrari in Casablanca
The Boar's Head – Henry IV, Part 1 and Henry IV, Part 2 by William Shakespeare
The Boar's Nest – The Dukes of Hazzard
The Boatman – Four Weddings and a Funeral (1994); The Kings Arms, 30 High Street, Amersham, HP7 0DJ
Bob's Country Bunker – The Blues Brothers, later renamed Bob's Country Kitchen in the sequel
Boobies – Space Dandy
Border Watch Inn – The Elder Scrolls IV: Oblivion
Bottiglia Liquor Wholesale Grand Theft Auto: Liberty City Stories and Grand Theft Auto: Vice City Stories
 Brady Pub – Days of Our Lives
Braidwood Inn – The Elder Scrolls V: Skyrim
The Brass Lantern – Fallout 3
The Brick – Northern Exposure
The Broken Drum/The Mended Drum – Ankh-Morpork in Terry Pratchett's Discworld
Broken Keel Tavern – World of Warcraft
The Broken Stool – The Cleveland Show
The Bronze – Buffy the Vampire Slayer (1997)
Broome's (Coast City) – Arrow, episode "Legacies"
The Buck's Head Inn – Far from the Madding Crowd, by Thomas Hardy
The Bull – The Archers, BBC radio series
The Bull – Beast
Bull and Butcher – The Day of the Triffids
Bunnys – The Young Doctors
Burger Bar – Red Dwarf
Burger Cat – RedCat, by Davilex Games
The Butchers Arms – Last of the Summer Wine

C
Café Nervosa – Frasier
Café René – 'Allo 'Allo!
Callahan's Place – Callahan's Crosstime Saloon
Candlehearth Hall – The Elder Scrolls V: Skyrim
Candlelight Club – Waterloo Bridge (1940)
The Cap & Bell – Saloon Bar (1940)
The Cat & Fiddle – the other pub in The Archers, BBC radio series
Catherines Bar – Death in Paradise (TV series)
Charlie's – Harvey (1950), starring James Stewart
Charlie's – Neighbours
Chatsubo – Neuromancer, 1984 novel by William Gibson
Cheers – Cheers
Chez Quis – Ferris Bueller's Day Off
China Coast – Alias Nick Beal
The Clansman – Still Game
Clintz Bar – Grand Theft Auto: Vice City and Grand Theft Auto: Vice City Stories
Club 13 – The Falcon Takes Over
Club Obi Wan – Indiana Jones and the Temple of Doom (1984)
Club Pluto – The Adventures of Pluto Nash (2002)
Club Sugar Ray – Harlem Nights (1989)
Cocktails and Dreams – Cocktail (1988)
Cohan's – The Quiet Man (1952)
Colcot Arms – Gavin & Stacey
Colonial Taphouse – Fallout 4
Cooper's – King of Queens
Copa – Rownd a Rownd
Copacabana – Goodfellas
Corrado Italian Bistro – Arrow, episode "The Calm"
The Corral – Terminator 2: Judgment Day
The Count's Arms – The Elder Scrolls IV: Oblivion
Countryman Inn – Jonathan Creek
Cowshed aka Cow's Hed – Time Gentlemen Please
The Crab & Lobster – Doc Martin (2004—)
Crab Shack (formerly Ernie's Crab Shack) – My Name is Earl (2005)
The Crab Shed – How I Met Your Mother, episode "Sunrise"
The Crazy Cock – Far Cry 3The Crazy Horse – The SopranosCrocs Bar – Grand Theft Auto: Vice CityThe Cross Hands – The World's End (film): The fourth of 12 pubs on the "golden mile" pub crawl
The Crow & Crown – Withnail and I (1987)
The Crown – Hot Fuzz (2007)
The Crown – Men Behaving Badly (1992—1998)
The Crow's Nest – The Perfect Storm (2000)

D
Daddy Crab Leg's Crab Shack – Saving Hope, episode "Remains of the Day"
Dagmar – the pub where Angie Watts works in EastEndersDal Riata – Lost GirlDante's – The Seventh VictimDe Rossi's Wine Bar – Doctor Who, episode "Partners in Crime"
Dead Man's Drink – The Elder Scrolls V: SkyrimDead Mike's – Scooby Doo (2002) 
Deri Arms – Pobol y CwmDeville – Arrow, episode "Vertigo"
Dexter Lake Club – National Lampoon's Animal House (1978)
Diamond Sky – Grand Theft Auto AdvanceDino's Bar and Grill – The Boys Are Back In Town, 1976 song by Thin Lizzy, on their 6th studio album JailbreakThe Dirty Sanchez – DodgeBall: A True Underdog StoryThe Dog and Handgun – Bottom, rival pub of The Lamb and Flag, staff are seen in the episode "Dough" (1995) during the quiz night scene at the aforementioned pub, with one barman getting a near-fatal electric shock from the buzzer, after Edward Hitler (Adrian Edmondson) tampered with it earlier. The pub is never actually seen in the series.
The Dog and Dart – Mount Pleasant 
Dog And Duck – No Angels (2004-2006)
The Dog and Gun – Coronation StreetThe Dog and Partridge – Dad's Army 
The Dog in the Pond – HollyoaksThe Dolphin – Peep Show
The Domain of the King Bar and Grille – Mostly Harmless, fifth novel in The Hitchhiker's Guide to the Galaxy series by Douglas Adams
Dorsia – [[American Psycho (film)|American Psycho]] (2000)
Double Deuce – Road House (1989)
The Dragon of Wantley – an inn in The Barchester Chronicles, making its first appearance in The Warden as belonging to "The Barchester Reformer", John  Bold. 
The Downy Pelican – Poet's Pub (1949)
The Dripping Dagger – Dick Tracy vs. Cueball 
The Drowned Trout – RocknRolla (2008)
The Drovers Arms – All Creatures Great and Small
The Drunken Clam – the bar and primary haunt of Peter Griffin in Family Guy
The Drunken Dragon Inn – The Elder Scrolls IV: Oblivion
The Drunken Huntsman – The Elder Scrolls V: Skyrim
Dubh Linn Irish Brew – Ugly Betty
Dugout Inn – Fallout 4
The Duke Of Burgundy – Passport to Pimlico (1949)
Duke's Pub – Frasier (Martin Crane's favorite hangout until it is closed down, after which he frequents McGinty's)
Durer's – Sherlock Holmes and the Secret Weapon
Dwight's Bar – Burlesque

E
The Earl Of Osbourne – Inn for Trouble (1960)
Earhart's – Officer's club on Babylon 5, located in the titular station's Red Sector
Eden Hall – Bartender (manga)
El Rancho – Citizen Kane 
Electric Psychedelic Pussycat Swingers Club – Austin Powers: International Man of Mystery
The Elephant (London, 1599) – Doctor Who, episode "The Shakespeare Code"
Elfsong Tavern – Baldur's Gate: Dark Alliance
The Eolian – The Kingkiller Chronicle
Essence – Parks and Recreation, episode "Two Parties"
Esther's Magic Bean – Hollyoaks

F
The Famous – The World's End (2013): The third of 12 pubs on the "golden mile" pub crawl
Fangtasia – True Blood (2008)
The Feathers – Dad's Army
The Feathers – The Royle Family
The Feed Bag – The Elder Scrolls IV: Oblivion
The Feisty Goat Pub – Eurotrip
The First Post – The World's End (film) (2013): The first of 12 pubs on the "golden mile" pub crawl
Fitzgerald's – Ballykissangel
The Five Claws Lodge – The Elder Scrolls IV: Oblivion
Flanagan's Cocktails & Dreams – Cocktail (1988 film)
Flanahan's Hole – Community, episode "Mixology Certification"
Florian's – Murder, My Sweet
The Flowers of Gold – The Elder Scrolls III: Morrowind
The Flowing Bowl – The Elder Scrolls IV: Oblivion
The Flying Horse – Coronation Street'''s other pub
The Flying Swan – The Brentford Trilogy by Robert Rankin
The Foaming Flask – The Elder Scrolls IV: OblivionFoley's – Mrs. Brown's BoysFool and Bladder – Sir Henry at Rawlinson EndFounding Fathers – BonesFour Shields Tavern – The Elder Scrolls V: SkyrimFree the Paedos – Super Hans' suggested pub name in Peep ShowFriendsy's – Seeking a Friend for the End of the WorldFrostfruit Inn – The Elder Scrolls V: SkyrimThe Frozen Hearth – The Elder Scrolls V: SkyrimFuller's – Operation Good GuysG
Gallow's End Tavern – World of WarcraftThe Garrison – Peaky BlindersGary's Old Towne Tavern – rival bar to Cheers
Gary's – MirandaGaston's – Beauty and the Beast (1991)
The Gates of Hell – BayonettaGateway Inn – The Elder Scrolls III: MorrowindThe Gentleman Loser – Neuromancer by William Gibson; name comes from the track "Midnite Cruiser" on the 1972 Steely Dan album Can't Buy a ThrillThe George III – Rip Van Winkle by Washington Irving; changed its name to the George Washington Hotel after 1776
Glenister's – Life on Mars (U.S. version); a "cop bar" named in tribute to Philip Glenister of the original version
The Globe and Anchor – Heartbreak Ridge (1986)
The Goat and Compasses – Dad's ArmyThe Goat and Compasses, Fitzrovia – Framley Parsonage, Chapter  32; Sowerby goes there to meet the debt collector Tom Tozer
The Gold Room at the Overlook Hotel – The Shining by Stephen King and the 1980 film adaptation
The Golden Lion – Doc MartinThe Golden Perch – The Lord of the RingsGolden Pheasant – The Private Life of Don JuanThe Good Companions – The World's End (film) (2013): The fifth of 12 pubs on the "golden mile" pub crawl
The Granville – Operation Good GuysThe Grapes – Early DoorsThe Grasshopper – The Titfield ThunderboltGray's Bar – Cougar TownGreely's – Unforgiven (1992)
The Green Dragon in Hobbiton – The Lord of the RingsThe Green Man – The Wicker ManThe Greyhound – World Shut Your MouthThe Grey Mare – The Elder Scrolls IV: OblivionThe Griffin – New Girl, the bar was previously called "Clyde's Bar" in the early seasons.
Grilby's – UndertaleThe Grind & Jolt Cafe – Arrow, episode "The Magician"
Gus's Galaxy Grill – Spaceballs (1987)

H
The Hand & Racquet, East Cheam – Hancock's Half HourThe Hand of Glory – A Canterbury Tale (1944)
The Hanged Man – Dragon Age IIHangman's Knot – Dick Tracy Meets GruesomeThe Hangman's Noose – The Press Wars series (and other series by Neil Dabb)
Harry Hope's Saloon – The Iceman Cometh, 1939 play by Eugene O'Neill
The Herald's Rest – Dragon Age: InquisitionThe Hip Joint – Futurama (1999)
The Hog's Head – a pub in the Harry Potter series
The Hole In The Wall – The World's End (film) (2013): The eleventh of 12 pubs on the "golden mile" pub crawl
The Horse & Groom, Cottington – Arthur Dent's local in The Hitchhiker's Guide to the GalaxyThe Hound Pits Pub – DishonoredI
The Icon – DoctorsThe Ink & Paint Club – Who Framed Roger Rabbit (1988)
Inn of Ill Omen – The Elder Scrolls IV: OblivionInn of the Last Home – DragonlanceThe Intersection – How I Met Your Mother, episode "Challenge Accepted"
The Iron Horse – Freaks and GeeksThe Ivy Bush – in the Westfarthing of the Shire, in JRR Tolkien's The Lord of the RingsJ
Jack Rabbit Slim's – Pulp FictionJack's Crocodile Bar -- "Where deals are made over a beer and a bite." -- "American Gods"
Jenny's – Still Game (the renamed Clansman, although still referred to as The Clansman by the regulars)
Jimmy's Bar – Detroit: Become HumanThe Jockey – ShamelessJoe's – Grey's AnatomyJohn McRory's Place – Leverage, the bar downstairs from Nate's apartment

K
Kadie's Club Pecos – Sin City, a series of neo-noir comics by Frank Miller
Kavanagh's Irish Pub – The WireThe Kebab & Calculator – The Young Ones (1982)
Kelcy's – All in the Family (1971-1979)
Kennedy's – ScarlettThe King and Queen Tavern – The Elder Scrolls IV: OblivionThe King's Head – The World's End (film) (2013): The tenth of 12 pubs on the "golden mile" pub crawl
The Kit Kat Klub – CabaretThe King of Prussia – EmmerdaleKorova Milk Bar – A Clockwork Orange, a dystopian novel by Anthony Burgess & its 1971 film adaptation

L
The Lamb & Flag – Bottom (1991-1995)
The Last Chance Saloon – The RiflemanThe Last Resort – Total Recall (1990)
The Leaky Cauldron – a public house in the Harry Potter series and the entryway into Diagon Alley in London
The Learned Goat – Bone TomahawkLevy's – Lady in the LakeThe Lobo – RoseanneThe Lock – Family AffairsThe Lock – Lock, Stock...The Loft – HollyoaksThe Long Branch Saloon – GunsmokeThe Lord Nelson – MongrelsThe Lost Lady Saloon – The Outlaw Josey WalesLouie's – TaleSpin
Low Point – How I Met Your Mother, episode "How Your Mother Met Me"
Lucky Lockup – The Elder Scrolls III: MorrowindLusty Leopard – How I Met Your MotherLUX – Lucifer

M
Maccadam's Old Oil House – Transformers franchise
MacLaren's Pub – How I Met Your Mother (2005)
MacLaren's Pub (East Side) – How I Met Your Mother, episode "How Your Mother Met Me"
Mad Dog Saloon – Bill & Ted's Excellent AdventureThe Maidenhead – Serenity (2005)
The Malt Shovel – formerly the other pub in EmmerdaleMaxwell's Nightclub (Metropolis) – Smallville, episode "Charade"
McAnally's – The Dresden Files, a series of contemporary fantasy/mystery novels written by Jim Butcher
McCoy's – Fair City, Long running Irish soap opera set in Dublin
McGinty's – Boondock Saints (1999)
McGinty's – Early Edition (1996)
McGinty's – Frasier (Martin Crane's hangout after Duke's pub is closed down)
McKenna's -- Lou Grant, ground floor bar and restaurant in the Los Angeles Tribune building. In one episode, its owner was played by Rue McClanahan.
Meibeyer's – The Pale King, 2011 novel by David Foster Wallace
Merlotte's Bar and Grill – True BloodThe Mermaid – The World's End (film) (2013): The eighth of 12 pubs on the "golden mile" pub crawl
Mesmer Club – The Woman in Green 
Mickey Finn's Palace – Way Out WestMidnight Bell – 20,000 Streets Under the Sky by Patrick Hamilton
The Midnight Star – Silverado (1985)
Milk – The L WordMilliways – Restaurant at the End of the Universe, second novel in The Hitchhiker's Guide to the Galaxy series by Douglas Adams
Mr. Pubbs – Cheers, episode "The Beer is Always Greener"
Moe's Tavern – The SimpsonsThe Mohune Arms – Moonfleet, by J. Meade Faulkner
The Monkey Bar – Tales of the Gold MonkeyThe Moon Under Water – "The Moon Under Water", 1946 essay by George Orwell
The Moonrakers – Hobson's ChoiceMos Eisley cantina, aka "Chalmun's Cantina" – the bar in Star Wars Episode IV: A New HopeThe Mucky Duck – Man About The HouseMuggy's – Fangirl, novel by Rainbow Rowell
Mulberry Street Bar – The Godfather Part IIIMunden's Bar – Grimjack (comic)
The Mayhew – Two Pints of Lager and a Packet of Crisps (2001)
Mystic Grill – The Vampire DiariesN
The Nag's Head – Only Fools and HorsesNeptune's – BenidormNew Found Out – Being Human'New York Bar (atop the Park Hyatt Tokyo) – Lost in Translation (2003)
Night Spot – Torchwood, episode "Day One"
Noah's Bar – Home and AwayO
The Oak and Crosier – The Elder Scrolls IV: OblivionThe Oblivion Bar – DC Comics; exists in a hidden pocket dimension of magic
Occidental Private Club – The Blue Lotus by Hergé
Ol' Souris - TransformiceThe Old Familiar – The World's End (film) (2013): The second of 12 pubs on the "golden mile" pub crawl
The Old Haunt – CastleThe Old Phoenix – A Midsummer TempestThe Old Pink Dog – So Long and Thanks for All the Fish by Douglas Adams
The Ox and Lamb – Star Trek: Voyager: 'Fair Haven' – the little Irish pub in the holodeck 
Old Prospector Saloon – Fallout: New VegasThe Orange Tree – Teachers (2004)
O'Malley's – "Escape", 1979 song by Rupert Holmes
O'Malley's Bar – 1996 song of the same name by Nick Cave and the Bad Seeds, on their 9th studio album Murder BalladsP
P3 – Charmed
Paddy's Pub – It's Always Sunny in PhiladelphiaPalace Royale – Dance, Girl, DancePalace Saloon (1885) – Back to the Future Part III (1990)
Paradise Club – Dick Tracy (1945)
The Peach Pit – Beverly Hills, 90210 (1990)
Pembroke House – The Woman in Green 
The Pie Hole – Pushing DaisiesThe Pig and Whistle – World of WarcraftThe Pilgrim's Rest – The Elder Scrolls III: MorrowindThe Place – The Big Time, a short 1958 sci-fi novel by Fritz Leiber
Playaz Club – 1994 song of the same title by Rappin' 4-Tay, on his second album Don't Fight the Feelin'The Plot and Plaster – The Elder Scrolls III: MorrowindThe Plumbers' Arms – Teachers (2001-2003)
Poison – Arrow, episode "Lone Gunmen"
The Poison Apple – Shrek 2
The Pool Hall (Pleasure Island) – Pinocchio (1940)
Poor Richard's – American version of The OfficePorky's – Porky'sThe Prancing Pony – The Lord of the RingsThe Punch Tavern – Oblivion by Anthony Horowitz
The Purple Pit – Cinderfella with Jerry Lewis
Puzzles – How I Met Your MotherQ
Quark's – Star Trek: Deep Space NineThe Queen Victoria – EastEndersThe Queen's Haemorrhoids – Jabberwocky (1977)

R
The Rabennest (Raven's Nest) – WolfensteinThe Ragged Flagon – The Elder Scrolls V: Skyrim (a den of thieves)
The Railway Arms – Life on MarsThe Rat in the Pot – The Elder Scrolls III: MorrowindThe Raven – Marion Ravenwood's bar in Nepal in Raiders of the Lost Ark of the Indiana Jones franchise
The Red Boot Pub – Grounded for LifeThe Red Pony – LongmireRed Lobster Inn – Pinocchio
The Regal Beagle – Three's CompanyRick's Café  – CasablancaThe Rising Sun – Merlin (BBC TV series)Rolliver's Inn – Tess of the d'Urbervilles by Thomas Hardy
Romanoff's – The Little Sister by Raymond Chandler
The Rooster Bar – The Rooster Bar by John Grisham
The Rose & Crown (London, 1892) – Doctor Who, episode "The Snowmen"
The Rose & Thorn – The Riyria ChroniclesRosie's Bar – M*A*S*HRoulette (Metropolis) – Smallville, episode "Roulette"
Rovers Return Inn – Coronation StreetRowlf's Tavern – The Muppets The Royal Barge – Bergerac (TV series)
The Rusty Anchor – The Golden GirlsS
Sailors Arms – Under Milk Wood 
St. Elmo's Bar – St. Elmo's Fire (1985)
Salieri's Bar – Mafia: The City of Lost Heaven 
Sally Lunds Café – Cat People (1942)
Salty Sailor Tavern – World of WarcraftSalty Spitoon – SpongeBob SquarePantsSamoan Joe's – Lock, Stock and Two Smoking Barrels (1998)
Sandbox – How I Met Your MotherSaxonwoldShebeen – SaxonwoldSazerac Saloon – Virginia City (1940)
The Scarecrow and Mrs King – Daffyd Thomas sketches in Little BritainScarlet Raven Tavern – World of WarcraftSeagrass – Arrow, episode "Muse of Fire"
The Shakespeare – Being Human, Being Human novels
Shamrock Taphouse – Fallout 4Shooters – Melrose PlaceThe Silent Woman – The Scarecrow of Romney Marsh, Disney TV miniseries starring Patrick McGoohan (1963); episode 1 and 3
Silver-Blood Inn – SkyrimSilverclub – The Saint in New York (1938)
The Silver Dollar Saloon – BonanzaThe Siren – GothamThe Six Jolly Fellowship Porters – Our Mutual Friend, by Charles Dickens
The Skinners Arms – Steptoe and SonThe Slaughtered LambvAn American Werewolf in London (1981)
The Slaughtered Prince – Stardust (2007)
Sleeping Giant Inn – SkyrimThe Sleeping Mare Inn – The Elder Scrolls IV: OblivionThe Smack – Rapscallion by James McGee
The Smash Club – Full House and Fuller HouseSnakehole Lounge – Parks and Recreation, episode "Telethon"
The Snake Pit (aka Taffy's Place) -- Blade Runner (1982)
The Snug – Life on Mars (U.S. version)
The Spotted Dog – Game OnStarlight Roof, The Green Lantern – The Long Goodbye, by Raymond Chandler
Steinway Beer Garden – Grand Theft Auto IVStonefire Tavern – World of WarcraftStone's Throw/Scorched Bone/Setting Sun – A Darker Shade of Magic by V.E. Schwab
Strokes – EastEndersSU Bar – HollyoaksThe Swan – Jez's proposed pub name in Peep Show (filmed at the Mitre, Hackney)
The Swan & Paedo – a compromise proposal, in Peep ShowT
Tabard – The Canterbury Tales by Geoffrey Chaucer
Table Salt – Arrow, episode "Vendetta"
The Tall Ship – River CityTalon – Smallville (2001)
Tavern – Over the Garden Wall (2014 miniseries)
Tavern of Time – World of WarcraftTen Forward – Star Trek: The Next GenerationTen Green Bottles – Grand Theft Auto: San AndreasThe Third Rail – Fallout 4The Three Cripples – Oliver TwistThe Thorax Bar (Society) – Gamer (2009)
The Three Broomsticks – Harry Potter series
The Three Sisters' Inn – The Elder Scrolls IV: OblivionThe Time In A Bottle – DC Comics; a London pub which every British super recognises as neutral territory. Frequented by Knight (DC Comics)
Thunderbrew Distillery – World of WarcraftTurk's Head – The Great GarrickTitty Twister – From Dusk Till DawnTitty Typhoon – Danganronpa 2: Goodbye DespairTorchy's – Streets of Fire (1984)
Trees Lounge – Trees LoungeThe Tropicana – I Love LucyThe Trusty Servant – The World's End (film) (2013): The sixth of 12 pubs on the "golden mile" pub crawl
The Two-Headed Dog – The World's End (film) (2013): The seventh of 12 pubs on the "golden mile" pub crawl

U
The Ullswater Hotel – The LakesUnderworld Tavern – Deus ExV
Vardi's – The Big Sleep, by Raymond Chandler
The Venusville Bar – Total Recall (1990)
Verdant – Arrow (2012)
Very Cool Secret Bar – How I Met Your Mother, episode "The Lighthouse"
The Vigilante – Citizen SmithVolpe's – Mean Streets (1973)
The Vulgar Unicorn – Thieves' WorldW
The Wakeley Arms – Straw DogsWalhalla – The Lady from ShanghaiThe Wandering Company – A Fire Upon the Deep, by Vernor Vinge
Wandin Valley RSL – A Country PracticeWeatherfield Arms (known as the "Weathy Arms") – Coronation StreetWeeb's Sports Grill – Full HouseWelsh's Bar – The Deer Hunter (1978)
West Weald Inn – The Elder Scrolls IV: OblivionThe Whippet Inn – Carry On at Your ConvenienceThe White Hart – How Do You Want Me?The White Hart – Tales from the White Hart, by Arthur C. Clarke 
The White Hart – The Anti-Death League, by Kingsley Amis
The White Swan – Man About the HouseThe Winchester Tavern – Shaun of the Dead (2004)
The Winchester Club – MinderWindpeak Inn – SkyrimThe Winking Skeever – Skyrim (A skeever is a kind of large rat within the game.)
The Woolpack – EmmerdaleWorld's End Tavern – World of WarcraftThe World's End – The World's End (film) (2013): The twelfth and last of 12 pubs on the "golden mile" pub crawl, where the climactic scenes of the film's story play out
Wurstbraterei – TatortY
 Y Deri Arms – Pobol y Cwm (1974)
 The Yellow Flag – Black LagoonZ
 The Zodiac club – Bell Book and Candle''

See also

List of public house topics
List of real London pubs in literature

References

External links

pubs
 
Fictional